= Myanmar Women Self Defense Center =

Burmese female self-defense organization

Myanmar Women Self Defense Center (MWSDC) is an organization founded by three women in February 2016 in Yangon, Myanmar. MWSDC aims to build Myanmar women's knowledge of how to protect themselves against sexual harassment.

Founding members are Michelle, Evelyn Yu Yu Swe and Saw Yu Ko.
